At the Rainbow (re-released as Live at the Rainbow) is the first live album from the Dutch rock band Focus, released in October 1973 on Imperial Records. The album was recorded at the Rainbow Theatre in London on 5 May 1973 by The Pye Mobile Unit, recording engineer Alan Perkins. A studio album was initially slated for release, but it was shelved due to disagreements within the band. (An album compiled from the tapes of these sessions was later released with the title Ship of Memories.) At the Rainbow was released instead.

Track listing

Vinyl release

CD release 1988

Performed at the show, but unreleased 
 "Anonymus 2"
 "House of the King" (Instrumental) (filmed)
 Lute solo ("Britannia" by John Dowland)

Personnel 
Focus
 Thijs van Leer – keyboards, flute, vocals
 Jan Akkerman – guitar
 Bert Ruiter – bass guitar
 Pierre van der Linden – drums

Charts

Certifications

References 

Focus (band) albums
1973 live albums
Albums produced by Mike Vernon (record producer)
Imperial Records live albums